John Murphy (born 4 March 1965) is a British film composer. He is a self-taught multi-instrumental musician who began his career in the 1980s, working with The Lotus Eaters, Thomas Lang, and Claudia Brücken. He has collaborated with directors Danny Boyle, Guy Ritchie, Michael Mann, Matthew Vaughn, Stephen Frears, and James Gunn. His awards include the Silver Award (1st Prize) at the Cannes Film Festival, a British D&AD Award, and a BMI Award.

Murphy gained recognition in the film industry while working with Guy Ritchie on his film Lock, Stock and Two Smoking Barrels, Michael Mann's Miami Vice, Matthew Vaughn's Kick-Ass and scoring various films by Danny Boyle. His instrumental tracks "In the House – In a Heartbeat" from 28 Days Later and "Adagio in D Minor" from Sunshine have been featured in a variety of TV shows, commercials and film trailers.

Background
Born in Liverpool, England, Murphy began composing music for films in the early 1990s and scored his first hit with Leon the Pig Farmer. Together with former OMD member David Hughes, he worked on several successful British movies, enjoying particular success with the soundtrack to 1998's Lock, Stock and Two Smoking Barrels.

Since 2000's Snatch, Murphy has worked independently and has been based in Los Angeles. His successes include Danny Boyle's box-office success 28 Days Later and its sequel 28 Weeks Later. He also collaborated with Underworld to score Danny Boyle's science fiction film Sunshine. In 2006, Murphy composed the score for Michael Mann's Miami Vice. In 2009, he composed the music for the 2009 remake of the 1972 film The Last House on the Left, followed by 2010's Kick-Ass, based on the comic book of the same name. Other excerpts from his scores have been released for advertising, in particular "In the House – In a Heartbeat" from 28 Days Later, and "Adagio in D minor" from Sunshine.

In 2014, he released an album titled Anonymous Rejected Filmscore that had been, as the title suggests, composed for a film whose studio head had rejected for being too 'weird'. Murphy promised the director that he wouldn't name the film. The score was allowed to develop in directions unconstrained by the original film's narrative and the cover art is a photograph of Murphy's son, taken by his wife through her sunglasses. 

In 2019 he scored "Les Miserables" for the BBC, and in 2020, he composed the score for James Gunn's The Suicide Squad.

Discography

Film

Documentaries

Television

Charting discography

References

External links
 
 

1965 births
20th-century British composers
20th-century British male musicians
21st-century British composers
21st-century British male musicians
British film score composers
La-La Land Records artists
Living people
British male film score composers
Musicians from Liverpool
Varèse Sarabande Records artists